The Relief of Newark (21 March 1644) was a Royalist victory during the First English Civil War. It was a personal victory for Prince Rupert and it resulted in the Royalists holding Newark-on-Trent until very near the end of the war.

Background
At the start of 1644, King Charles hoped to form an army in the northwest of England, built around regiments which he had been able to bring back from Ireland as a result of the signing of a treaty, or "cessation", with the Catholic Confederates. Lord Byron commanded this army, but at the Battle of Nantwich on 26 January, Byron was defeated, with heavy casualties to the first regiments of foot landed from Ireland. In the aftermath of this setback, Charles ordered his nephew, Prince Rupert, to take command and restore Royalist fortunes in the northwest. Rupert set up his headquarters in Shrewsbury on 21 February.

Meanwhile, the Parliamentarian forces in the Midland counties advanced to besiege the Royalist stronghold of Newark-on-Trent. Newark was a vital garrison, as it dominated the River Trent, and also posed a threat to the Parliamentarians in the eastern counties of England. The town's defences were naturally very strong. The Trent divided above the town and merged below it, surrounding the town with water. The garrison under governor Richard Byron, brother of Lord Byron, fortified the town with earthworks and batteries.

The Parliamentarian force was led by an experienced Scottish professional soldier, Sir John Meldrum. On 6 March, Meldrum's forces crossed the eastern branch of the river, but were thrown back when they tried to attack the town on 8 March. Following the failed attack, the Parliamentarians began constructing formal siege works and entrenchments.

On 12 March, King Charles ordered Rupert to relieve Newark. Hastily returning to Shrewsbury from Chester, where he had been conferring with Lord Byron, Rupert collected a force based around his own regiment of horse, and musketeers detached mainly from two regiments from Ireland (Tillier's and Broughton's) which had recently landed in North Wales and which had therefore not been involved in the defeat at Nantwich. He marched towards Newark via the Royalist-held towns of Wolverhampton, Ashby-de-la-Zouch and Bingham, augmenting his force with troops drawn from their garrisons.

Battle
Although Meldrum had been warned of Rupert's approach, Rupert arrived too quickly for him to withdraw. Instead, Meldrum drew up his forces around the "Spittal", the ruins of St Leonard's Hospice which had been destroyed by fighting in the previous year, on the east side of the Trent. Fearing that Meldrum might still withdraw, Rupert's cavalry advanced by moonlight and attacked early in the morning of 21 March.

Rupert left a small troop under Colonel Charles Gerard in reserve, and led his own lifeguard of horse on the left wing in person, while Colonel Sir Richard Crane led Rupert's regiment of horse on the right wing. The Parliamentarian cavalry were led by Colonel Edward Rossiter on the left wing with troops raised from Nottinghamshire and Colonel Francis Thornhalgh on the right with troops from Lincolnshire. A third body of Parliamentarian horse from Derby was absent covering the siege works, so the numbers of opposing cavalry were roughly equal.

When Rupert attacked, the Parliamentarian right wing fled. Rupert himself was engaged in hand-to-hand fighting. The Parliamentarian left wing drove the Royalist right back. Gerard was unhorsed and captured leading a counterattack. Eventually Rossiter was outflanked and forced to withdraw, in good order. The Parliamentarians withdrew across a bridge of boats onto the "Island", the area between the two branches of the Trent.

When Rupert's infantry arrived, commanded by Colonel Henry Tillier, they attempted to capture the bridge of boats but were repulsed. Nevertheless, Meldrum's army was now trapped on the "Island". He had only a few days' rations, and there were quarrels among his officers, which culminated in a mutiny by a regiment from Norfolk. Meldrum asked for terms of surrender. His army was allowed to withdraw to nearby Parliamentarian garrisons, leaving behind all their weapons and ammunition. The Royalists secured 3,000 muskets, 11 guns and two mortars.

Aftermath
The Relief of Newark was perhaps Rupert's best personal triumph in the civil war. His rapid march and determined offensive had compelled a Parliamentarian force superior in numbers to his own scratch force to capitulate. He was unable to keep his army in being, as the detachments he had gathered on his march had to be returned to their garrisons. Nor did he have time to exploit his victory, as the Royalists were in difficulty elsewhere, both in the north and south of England.

Cultural References
The Siege and Relief of Newark is commemorated in a fantasia, "Newark Siege" by John Jenkins, who was the Court Composer to Charles I and Charles II. The piece is a notable example of programme music and consists of a pavane and a galliard.

Citations

References

Further reading

External links
British Civil War site

Battles of the English Civil Wars
1644 in England
Conflicts in 1644
Military history of Nottinghamshire
17th century in Nottinghamshire